Jolla Oy (sometimes referred to as Jolla Ltd.) is a Finnish technology company; vendor and developer of Sailfish OS. Headquartered in Tampere, Finland, Jolla has its own research and development offices in Helsinki, Tampere and Cyberport, Hong Kong. Jolla was founded in 2011 by former Nokia staff of the MeeGo project team to use the MeeGo opportunities and its "endless possibilities".

Pronounced 'yolla', the company name is Finnish for "dinghy" (a small agile boat or life rescue boat) and it refers to the possibility for the company to compete against giants like Samsung and Apple pictured in antithesis as big cruise ships. Then, the community and the media used the name as an ironic joke about the "burning platform" memo, which contained the metaphor "jump into the cold sea water" or "burn with burning platform" used in context of the Nokia business activities.

History 

In 2005, Nokia created a new GNU distro called OS2005, which shipped with the Nokia 770 Internet Tablet. It was renamed Maemo (version 5) and shipped with the Nokia N900 in 2009. An alliance of Nokia and Intel merged their Maemo and Moblin (also a free software GNU distro) projects into a new project called MeeGo in 2010. The same year, Nokia announced that the N8 would be the last flagship phone to run Symbian, and "Going forward, N-series devices will be based on MeeGo".

Unexpectedly, in 2011 the MeeGo project was cancelled, regardless of MeeGo's potential for success, as a cost-cutting measure by then-Nokia CEO, Stephen Elop. In compliance with agreements with Intel, one MeeGo device was released, the Nokia N9, which achieved iconic status .

Despite the N9 market success, the MeeGo project in Nokia was already doomed and a general atmosphere around it was having more and more negative influence on the MeeGo team and other Nokia employees. As a result, in October 2011, some of the MeeGo team left Nokia to form the project called Jolla, aimed at developing new opportunities with the GNU MeeGo OS, using funding from Nokia's "Bridge" program which helps establish and support start-up companies by ex-Nokia employees.

At the time, Nokia was supporting employees leaving the company with a €25,000 start-up grant, but Jolla's founders had not given any rights to patents or other intellectual property to Jolla. Jolla's Sailfish OS, which used middleware core stack of Mer, is a direct successor to MeeGo and the Jolla is successor of N9, but used only the open-sourced components of MeeGo, while the closed-source user interface design (of codename Harmattan) for all future devices had to be developed from scratch. As a result, new mobile standards were established together with Mer.

On 6 July 2012, Jolla publicly announced its intention to develop new smartphones that used a gesture-oriented swipe interface corresponding to former Nokia's Harmattan UI experience. They named their operating system "Sailfish OS", which includes a gesture-based user interface developed using Qt, QML and HTML5, as did Nokia's N9.

Jolla cooperated with others to grow their applications and the MeeGo platform. On 17 September 2013, it announced that the phone will be capable of running Android applications, thanks to the built-in Alien Dalvik. Due to formal limitations, the Google Play Store had to be installed by the end user manually. The ability to run Android applications on Linux has grown into the AppSupport product, which is offered for running Android apps on in-car infotainment systems and other embedded systems. This appears to be Jolla's main source of income, as of 2022-23. 

On 7 July 2015, after a failure of cooperation with Chinese manufacturer to deliver the Jolla Tablet, Jolla announced it would spin off its hardware operations to a brand new company, and continue to focus on current activities as a developer and licenser of the Sailfish OS.

In November 2015, Jolla had to lay off half of its employees due to financial problems caused by delayed financing from an investor. On 21 December 2015, forced to cancel the Jolla Tablet project, Jolla announced that they would be "shipping a small batch of the Jolla Tablet to early backers during early 2016" but "all of our backers will not get a Jolla Tablet", because their Chinese manufacturer had already produced a batch as a consequence of delayed financing, while it was impossible to produce more as essential components were no longer produced. Subsequently, in April 2016, Jolla launched a campaign to refund all the tablet payments that had been made during the crowd-sourcing campaign, but most backers lost their money.

After the setbacks with the tablet production, Jolla concentrated on developing the Sailfish mobile operating system. It acquired new investors in 2016, among them the Russian company Votron . In March 2018 they were joined by Rostelecom (which is state owned, that is, fully controlled by the Russian government) as investor, which took over Votron and OMP. Rostelecom owns 75% of the Sailfish based Aurora OS.

In August 2017, Sailfish X was introduced for the Sony Xperia X smartphone. Support for the Sony Xperia XA2 was added as beta in November 2018. Support for the newer Sony Xperia 10 was added in November 2019.

In February 2022 Jolla announced that it has discontinued its business in Russia during 2021 and is seeking a shareholder structure without Russian ownership.

Sailfish OS

Operating system
Sailfish OS is an operating system that can be adapted to different mobile devices. Also, the software can be tailored to best fit the consumer needs, from companies to mass consume. It is the core product of Jolla.

Sailfish OS is an evolution of the Nokia MeeGo and Mer project. It is based on GNU free software code powered with C, C++, Qt and QML. The core is developed on Linux kernel that enables a wide hardware support.

Sailfish OS has its own native applications that can be developed and uploaded in the store through the portal harbour.jolla.com. Thanks to Sailfish SDK, developers can fully emulate the whole OS behavior. This enables the development also for programmers who don't actually have a Sailfish device. Sailfish application are complemented by the Android ecosystem. Here with Alien Dalvik, third-party Android applications become compatible with Sailfish.

Sailfish OS has an open core that can be improved by the community but also a proprietary UI that is seen as the succession of the Nokia N9 interface. It is touch-based and the only available interface with true multitasking capabilities. Basic UI applications, like mail, contacts, camera are provided by Jolla and are under continuous development.

Sailfish OS 1 was launched in December 2013 with the first Jolla phone.

Sailfish OS 2 was implemented in November 2015 for the Jolla Tablet and made compatible for all other products onward.

Sailfish OS 3 was released on 11 November 2018. This version and its ongoing series of updates introduced a faster user interface. The new generation will be focused on privacy and security as well as extending the support to new hardware.

Sailfish OS 4 was released on 16 February 2021.

Sailfish OS products

 Jolla Mobile Phone (November 2013) - smartphone with Sailfish OS, 4.5in IPS qHD display, 16 GB storage, 1 GB RAM, a microSD slot and an 8 MP camera.
 Sony Xperia X in October 2017- Sailfish OS, single SIMsim, microSD up to 200 GB, 5” full HD display, 13 MP front camera.
 Gemini, by Planet Computers in January 2018 – Sailfish OS, 4G and WLAN, full physical keyboard, 5.99-inch screen, 5 MP camera and stereo speakers.

Support
The long support period of Sailfish OS for the Jolla 1 is remarkable. The phone was provided with a total of 34 updates and upgrades for a period of 7 years. This is especially remarkable considering the small size of Jolla Oy compared to Apple or Samsung.

AppSupport

AppSupport uses a Linux Container (LXC) to run an Android-like environment within an embedded Linux system. Jolla's November 2022 whitepaper claimed a 99.4% pass rate on the Android Compatibility Test Suite, at about 97% of the performance of an Android Open Source Project environment. As of that date, AppSupport could emulate Android versions up to Android 10 (API 29, released in September 2019) and install unmodified APK files.

See also
 Microsoft Mobile
 HMD Global
 Alcatel Mobile

References

External links
 

Companies established in 2011
Electronics companies of Finland
Finnish brands
MeeGo
Mobile phone companies of Finland
Mobile phone manufacturers
Companies based in Tampere
Telecommunications equipment vendors